Antonio Manrique, O.F.M. (died 1589) was a Roman Catholic prelate who served as Bishop of Calahorra y La Calzada (1587–1589).

Biography
Antonio Manrique was ordained a priest in the Order of Friars Minor. 
On 7 August 1587, he was appointed during the papacy of Pope Sixtus V as Bishop of Calahorra y La Calzada.
In November 1587, he was consecrated bishop by Gaspar de Quiroga y Vela, Archbishop of Toledo, with Sebastián Pérez (bishop), Bishop of Osma, and Diego de la Calzada, Titular Bishop of Salona, serving as co-consecrators.
He served as Bishop of Calahorra y La Calzada until his death on 30 January 1589.

References

External links and additional sources
 (for Chronology of Bishops)
 (for Chronology of Bishops)

16th-century Roman Catholic bishops in Spain
Bishops appointed by Pope Sixtus V
1589 deaths
Franciscan bishops